is a German rapper of Japanese descent known as Blumio. His 2005 single "Meine Lieblingsrapper" debuted at number 2 on the German Urban TRL charts.

Early life and career 
Kuniyoshi was born 1985 in Hilden, a town located near Düsseldorf, home to the largest Japanese community in Germany. 
Inspired by the American rapper Ice-T, Blumio began, at the age of 14, to write his own rap lyrics.

In 2002, he applied for an MC contest with a cassette. After an Internet vote, Blumio won the contest, beating many contestants, among them Berlin rapper Taichi. Following that, Blumio drew the attention of music producer Don Tone. Don Tone invited him to his studio in Düsseldorf, where Blumio came in contact with several notable German rappers, including Eko Fresh and the Aggro Berlin rappers.

In 2005, Blumio made his breakthrough with his single "Meine Lieblingsrapper", in which he imitates notable German rappers, such as Massiv, Jan Delay and Azad. Rapper Sido, who had not been imitated by Blumio, provided additional vocals for the song.

In December 2008, Blumio released the album "Rush Hour" in collaboration with the "BTM-Squad" member Habesha. The work was the first release on Blumio's label "Japsensoul". His second LP, "Yellow Album" appeared in June 2009. This was followed in September 2010 by his third album, "Tokio Bordell". The singles "Eberhard" and "Die Welt ist schwul" were taken from it.

In 2016, Blumio moved to Tokyo, Japan, where he currently resides.  His first Japanese single "UNIQLO" was released on YouTube on 3 August 2017.

Discography

Albums 
 2004: I Love Deutschrap (Mix CD)
 2008: Rush Hour (with Habesha)
 2009: Yellow Album
 2010: Tokio Bordell
 2011: Yellow Album Reloaded
 2012: Drei
 2015: Blumiologie
 2018: Demo

Singles 
2007: Meine Lieblingsrapper (Maxi Single)
2009: Rosenkrieg (featuring Zemine)
2009: Antigewaltsong
2009: Hey Mr. Nazi
2009: H.D.G.D.L
2009: Intro
2010: Lass mal über Haie Reden
2011: Wir träumen gemeinsam von besseren Tagen (E-Single)

Videos 
 2009: Antigewaltsong
 2009: Rosenkrieg
 2009: Hey Mr. Nazi
 2009: H.D.G.D.L.
 2010: Lass mal über Haie reden
 2010: Ich mag dich irgendwie
 2012: Der letze Samurai
 2012: Wir träumen gemeinsam von besseren Tagen
 2017: UNIQLO

References

External links 
 Official website

 MTV biography

German rappers
German people of Japanese descent
Living people
Musical groups from Düsseldorf
1985 births